Koch (also Romanized as Kech) is a village in Pir Sohrab Rural District, in the Central District of Chabahar County, Sistan and Baluchestan Province, Iran. At the 2006 census, its population was 705, in 126 families.

References 

Populated places in Chabahar County